The Beijing Angelic Choir is a children's choir based in Beijing, China.  It has toured extensively internationally.

It gained wider exposure when it won a National Association of Independent Record Distributors Award in the U.S. in 1995.

See also
Choir
Vienna Boys' Choir
NHK Tokyo Children's Choir

References

External links
The Discography of Beijing Angelic Choir

Choirs of children
Culture in Beijing
Chinese choirs